Humphrey Trevelyan, Baron Trevelyan,  (27 November 1905 – 9 February 1985) was a British colonial administrator, diplomat and writer. Having begun his career in the Indian Civil Service and Indian Political Service, he transferred to HM Diplomatic Service upon Indian independence in 1947, and had a distinguished career during which he held several important ambassadorships.

Biography 
Trevelyan was born at the parsonage, Hindhead, Surrey, the younger son of the Reverend George Trevelyan, great-grandson of the Venerable George Trevelyan, Archdeacon of Taunton, third son of Sir John Trevelyan, 4th Baronet. His elder brother John Trevelyan was the Secretary of the Board of the British Board of Film Censors. The historian George Macaulay Trevelyan was a second cousin.

He was educated at Lancing and Jesus College, Cambridge, where he read Classics. After Cambridge, Trevelyan joined the Indian Civil Service in 1929, transferring to the Indian Political Service in 1932.

He served in India until independence in 1947, then transferred to HM Diplomatic Service. He held many key diplomatic posts, including chargé d'affaires in Beijing after the Revolution, ambassador to Egypt at the time of Suez, a development with which he was clearly uncomfortable, ambassador to Iraq at the time of the 1961 Kuwait crisis, Iraq's first attempt to annex Kuwait, and ambassador to the Soviet Union. On his retirement in 1965, he was offered the post of Permanent Under-Secretary of State for Foreign Affairs, which he declined in order that a younger man should be appointed.

He completed forty years of public service as the last high commissioner of Aden, having been coaxed out of retirement by Foreign Secretary George Brown, where he wound up British protection and oversaw the British withdrawal from what had been the Aden Protectorate and became South Yemen.

Trevelyan wrote a number of books about his career, including The India We Left and The Middle East in Revolution.

On 12 February 1968, he was elevated to the House of Lords as a life peer with the title Baron Trevelyan, of Saint Veep in the County of Cornwall.

Trevelyan married Violet Margaret (Peggy) Bartholomew, only daughter of General Sir William Henry Bartholomew, in 1937; they had two daughters.

Arms

See also
Trevelyan baronets for earlier history of the family

References

|-

|-

|-

1905 births
1985 deaths
People educated at Lancing College
Alumni of Jesus College, Cambridge
Ambassadors of the United Kingdom to China
Ambassadors of the United Kingdom to Egypt
Knights of the Garter
Knights Grand Cross of the Order of St Michael and St George
Companions of the Order of the Indian Empire
Officers of the Order of the British Empire
Life peers
Diplomatic peers
Life peers created by Elizabeth II
British colonial governors and administrators in Asia
Indian Civil Service (British India) officers
Ambassadors of the United Kingdom to the Soviet Union
People of the Aden Emergency
Colony of Aden people
Ambassadors of the United Kingdom to Iraq
Indian Political Service officers